The Ingersoll, Ontario Town Centre has many purposes. On the main floor is a branch of the Oxford County Library. On the second floor are the offices for the town and the town council chambers as well as a meeting room. The offices are split in two; one side is Zoning, By-laws, structural etc., and the other is Administrative, Treasury, and Economic Development. The basement is closed to the public. It contains the I.T. department and extra storage.

History 
The building is situated on the site of an old hotel. There are rumours of a ghostly woman walking the halls at night in her sleeping gown crying, along with voices from the old bar. After the hotel was abandoned for several years, the town purchased the land and built a brand new office.

References

Buildings and structures in Oxford County, Ontario
City and town halls in Ontario
Government buildings completed in 1992
Ingersoll, Ontario